The Museu da Música ("Museum of Music") is a museum in Lisbon, Portugal. The museum primarily features musical instruments; among its holdings is a 1725 Stradivarius cello once owned and played by King Luís I of Portugal (ruled 1861–1889.

See also 
 List of music museums

References

Further reading

External links

Museu Nacional da Música no Google Arts & Culture

Museums in Lisbon
Musical instrument museums
Music organisations based in Portugal